North Monroeville is an unincorporated community in Erie County, Ohio, United States. Its name derives from Monroeville, an incorporated village south of the community and in Huron County. There is a cemetery in North Monroeville called the North Monroeville Cemetery that has existed since the early 19th century.

References

Unincorporated communities in Erie County, Ohio
Unincorporated communities in Ohio